The 2019–20 Hofstra Pride men's basketball team represented Hofstra University during the 2019–20 NCAA Division I men's basketball season. The Pride, led by seventh-year head coach Joe Mihalich, played their home games at Mack Sports Complex in Hempstead, New York as members of the Colonial Athletic Association, and won the regular season championship for the second year in a row.

After beating Northeastern 70–61 in the CAA championship game, the Pride won the CAA's automatic bid to the 2020 NCAA Division I men's basketball tournament. However, they would not ultimately appear, as the tournament was canceled due to the COVID-19 pandemic.

Previous season
The Pride finished the 2018–19 season 27–8, 15–3 in CAA play to claim the regular season CAA championship. They advanced to the championship game of the CAA tournament where they lost to Northeastern. As a regular season champion who failed to win their league tournament, they received an automatic bid to the National Invitation Tournament where they lost in the first round to NC State.

Offseason

Departures

Incoming transfers

2019 recruiting class

2020 recruiting class

Roster

Schedule and results

|-
!colspan=9 style=| Non-conference regular season

|-
!colspan=12 style=| CAA regular season

|-
!colspan=12 style=| CAA tournament
|-

Source

References

Hofstra Pride men's basketball seasons
Hofstra
Hofstra Pride men's basketball
Hofstra Pride men's basketball